The following is a list of episodes from the series Voltron: Legendary Defender. The first season was released on June 10, 2016. The first episode in Netflix is triple-length, creating a cumulative runtime for the season equal to the industry standard of 13 episodes, while other streaming services such as iTunes and Amazon have three separated episodes with the normal length of 23 minutes. The second season was released on January 20, 2017, the third season was released on August 4, 2017 and the fourth season was released on October 13, 2017. A fifth season was released on March 2, 2018, while the sixth season was released on June 15, 2018.  A seventh season was released on August 10, 2018. The eighth and final season was released on December 14, 2018. In South Korea (where the show was animated), the series was divided into three seasons of twenty-six episodes each.

Series overview

Episodes

Season 1 (2016)

Season 2 (2017)

Season 3 (2017)

Season 4 (2017)

Season 5 (2018)

Season 6 (2018)

Season 7 (2018)

Season 8 (2018)

Shorts
A series of shorts were released on the DreamWorksTV YouTube channel in the style of in-character vlogs.

References

External links

Voltron